Sacada pyraliformis is a species of snout moth (family Pyralidae). It is found in India.

References

Moths of Asia
Pyralinae
Moths described in 1879